Schonach im Schwarzwald is a town in the district of Schwarzwald-Baar in Baden-Württemberg in Germany.

Sport 

Winter sports, especially Nordic combined and cross-country skiing, have a great influence on Schonach. In every year, Schonach is a station of the FIS Nordic Combined World Cup holding the Schwarzwaldpokal. In 1981 and 2002, Schonach hosted the FIS Nordic Junior World Ski Championships.

Famous athletes from Schonach:

 Urban Hettich
 Hans-Peter Pohl
 Christian Dold
 Georg Hettich
 Hansjörg Jäkle
 Alexander Herr

Sights

Notable sights in the city of Schonach include:

The St. Urban, A Roman Catholic church
The Langenwaldschanze, a ski jumping hill, home to various championships
The 1st World Largest Cuckoo Clock

Schonach is part of various hiking trails in the region.
Also, the city has the title of a Luftkurort, German for health resort.

Notable people

Sons and Daughters of the Community 
 Benedikt Kuner (1889-1945), NSDAP district leader
 Karl Rombach (born 1951), politician (CDU), member of the Landtag of Baden-Württemberg
 Urban Hettich (born 1953), Nordic Combiner
 Hansjörg Jäkle (born 1971), ski jumper

People who are connected to the place 
 Hans-Peter Pohl (born 1965), Nordic combiner and Olympic Champion
 Georg Hettich (born 1978), Nordic combiner and Olympic Champion

References

Schwarzwald-Baar-Kreis